Strongsville is a city in Cuyahoga County, Ohio, United States, and a suburb of Cleveland. As of the 2010 census, the city population was 44,750. The city's nickname 'Crossroads of the Nation,' originated from the Baltimore and Ohio Railroad (B&O) intersecting with the Southwestern Electric Line that connected Cleveland and Wooster, Ohio. As the railroad line ceased operation in 1931, the motto and city seal have been adapted to reflect the modern day intersection of Interstate 71 and the Ohio Turnpike.

History
Strongsville officially became a township on February 25, 1818, a village in 1923, and was ultimately designated a city in 1961. Founded by settlers arriving in the newly purchased Connecticut Western Reserve, the city was named after John Stoughton Strong, the group's leader. Many of the main streets in the city are named after other principal figures and landowners from the city's history, e.g. Howe, Drake, Shurmer, Whitney.

In the mid-19th century, the Pomeroy House, then called The Homestead, was a stop on the underground railroad. Alanson Pomeroy, the home owner and a prominent Strongsville resident, concealed runaway slaves on his property. From this residence in Strongsville, the runaway slaves were taken to boats on Rocky River for passage to Canada.

In 1853, John D. Rockefeller's family moved to Strongsville. At the time, Rockefeller was only a child.

On April 11, 1965, an F4 tornado hit Strongsville; see 1965 Palm Sunday tornado outbreak.

Geography
Strongsville is located at  (41.312752, -81.831976).

The east branch of the Rocky River enters Strongsville from North Royalton and exits into Berea. Valley Parkway parallels the river's northwesterly course. This portion of the Cleveland Metroparks, named Mill Stream Run, includes Bonnie Park and Ranger Lake. Abutting the Rocky River, the recreation area offers visitors a pavilion, picnicking facilities, two small ponds, and several sport fields. Bonnie Park serves as a hub for hiking, bridle, and paved multi-purpose trails.

Demographics

The median income for a household in the city was $68,660, and the median income for a family was $76,964 (these figures had risen to $79,715 and $90,870 respectively as of a 2007 estimate). Males had a median income of $54,988 versus $33,129 for females. The per capita income for the city was $29,722. About 1.3% of families and 2.2% of the population were below the poverty line, including 1.7% of those under age 18 and 3.7% of those age 65 or over.

Of the city's population over the age of 25, 41.6% held a bachelor's degree or higher.

2010 census
As of the census of 2010, there were 44,750 people, 17,659 households, and 12,563 families living in the city. The racial makeup of the city was 92.0% White, 1.9% African American, 0.1% Native American, 4.1% Asian, 0.4% from other races, and 1.4% from two or more races. Hispanic or Latino of any race were 2.0% of the population.

There were 17,659 households, of which 31.5% had children under the age of 18 living with them, 60.5% were married couples living together, 7.4% had a female householder with no husband present, 3.2% had a male householder with no wife present, and 28.9% were non-families. 24.9% of all households were made up of individuals, and 10.9% had someone living alone who was 65 years of age or older. The average household size was 2.52 and the average family size was 3.04.

The median age in the city was 44.2 years. 23.3% of residents were under the age of 18; 6.4% were between the ages of 18 and 24; 21.6% were from 25 to 44; 32.5% were from 45 to 64; and 16.1% were 65 years of age or older. The gender makeup of the city was 48.6% male and 51.4% female.

2000 census
As of the census of 2000, there were 43,858 people, 16,209 households, and 12,383 families living in the city. The population density was 1,779.6 people per square mile (687.2/km). There were 16,863 housing units at an average density of 684.2 per square mile (264.2/km). The racial makeup of the city was 94.18% White, 1.26% African American, 0.05% Native American, 3.21% Asian, 0.01% Pacific Islander, 0.28% from other races, and 1.03% from two or more races. Hispanic or Latino of any race were 1.27% of the population.

There were 16,209 households, out of which 35.9% had children under the age of 18 living with them, 67.5% were married couples living together, 6.4% had a female householder with no husband present, and 23.6% were non-families. 19.9% of all households were made up of individuals, and 7.0% had someone living alone who was 65 years of age or older. The average household size was 2.69 and the average family size was 3.13.

In the city, the population was spread out, with 26.3% under the age of 18, 6.2% from 18 to 24, 28.5% from 25 to 44, 27.6% from 45 to 64, and 11.4% who were 65 years of age or older. The median age was 39 years. For every 100 females, there were 95.3 males. For every 100 females age 18 and over, there were 92.3 males.

Government
The current mayor, Thomas Perciak, was elected in November 2003 following the death of longtime mayor Walter F. Ehrnfelt on May 25, 2003.

Education
Strongsville High School serves students in grades 9 through 12.  The city's five elementary schools serve pre-kindergarten through 5th grade: Chapman, Kinsner, Muraski, Surrarrer, and Whitney. With Strongsville's younger student population on the decline, three elementary schools, Allen, Drake and Zellers, closed their doors in recent years. A private Catholic school, St. Joseph and John's, serves children through the 8th grade. In 2012, citizens approved a bond issue for $81 million. The bond money was used to build a new middle school, combining the old Center and Albion middle schools, renovations to the high school, technology upgrades to the elementary schools, and renovations to the preschool. The new middle school was built just in time for the 2016–2017 school year.

2013 Strongsville City Teachers' Strike
The Strongsville City Teachers' Strike was a labor strike organized by the Strongsville Education Association that lasted for eight weeks.

The strike commenced at 12:01 a.m. on March 4, 2013. The dispute is over a number of issues, notably teacher contracts, pay step increases, health insurance premium costs, and general working conditions. The Strongsville Education Association claims the Board does have the money to meet the teachers' salary requirements, but that "the 'projection' figures released by the Board on its website are no more than arbitrary, meaningless figures." The Strongsville Board of Education attests that the district is currently "operating in the red", meaning the district budget deficit will increase drastically if the status quo remains. Several rounds of negotiations over said issues between the S.E.A. and the B.O.E. have taken place since March 2010. The strike ended after eight weeks.

Places of Interest
Beebetown - Historic neighborhood 
 Gardenview Horticultural Park
 OBM Arena - Strongsville ice rink
 Mill Stream Run Reservation - The east branch of the Rocky River runs alongside this branch of the Cleveland Metroparks
 The Pomeroy House- A former stop on the Underground Railroad
Preserve of Strongsville - Strongsville's only national preserve
 Southpark Mall
 Strongsville Business & Technology Park - The largest industrial park in Northeast Ohio
 Strongsville Commons and Clock Tower
 Strongsville Historical Society
 Strongsville Water Tower - Previously painted by Ziggy creator Tom Wilson.  In 2019, the white water tower was repainted green and the Ziggy figure covered.
 Walter F. Ehrnfelt Covered Bridge

Notable people
Zebedee Coltrin (1804–1887) Mormon pioneer, authority in Church of Jesus Christ of Latter Day Saints
Tom Dimitroff Sr. (1935-1996) gridiron football player and coach
Bruce Drennan (1950-) sportscaster
Walter F. Ehrnfelt (1932-2003) politician
Asmahan Farhat (1990-) swimmer
Jenny Fish (1949-) Olympic speed skater
Nate Freese football player
Jackie Gayda (1981-) professional wrestler
Olga D. González-Sanabria scientist, inventor 
Michael Green (1989-) soccer player
Joe Haden football player
Paul Hoernemann (1916-1965) college football coach
Mark Hunter photographer and lead singer of Chimaira
Tim Kamczyc (1990-) basketball player 
Drew Kaser, NFL punter
Reggie Lee (1974-) actor
Fred McLeod (1952-2019) sportscaster 
Dayton Miller (1866–1941) physicist, astronomer, acoustician
Lorin Morgan-Richards (1975-) author and illustrator, primarily of children's literature (Beebetown, Ohio)
Tom Patton politician
Kyle Prandi (1979-) Olympic diver
Mike Pruitt football player
John D. Rockefeller (1839-1937) businessman, philanthropist
William Rockefeller (1841–1922) businessman, financier, co-founder of Standard Oil
George Myron Sabin (1833-1890) federal judge 
Isaac Sowells (1982-) football player
Herb Stein (1898-1980)  football player
Gary Suhadolnik politician
Daniel Martin Varisco (1951-) anthropologist, historian
Kyle Veris (1983-) soccer player
Matt Warburton television writer
Aaron White (1992-) professional basketball player
D. J. Woods (1989-) AFL football player

See also
Strongsville City Schools 2013 Teacher Strike

References

External links

 City of Strongsville
 Strongsville Chamber of Commerce

 
Cities in Ohio
Cities in Cuyahoga County, Ohio
Populated places established in 1818
Cleveland metropolitan area